The 1986 Austrian Grand Prix was a Formula One motor race held at Österreichring on 17 August 1986. It was the twelfth race of the 1986 Formula One World Championship.

The 52-lap race was won by Alain Prost, driving a McLaren-TAG, with Ferrari drivers Michele Alboreto and Stefan Johansson second and third respectively. With Drivers' Championship challengers Nigel Mansell, Nelson Piquet and Ayrton Senna all retiring, Prost moved into second place in the Championship, two points behind Mansell.

Qualifying

Qualifying report
Qualifying saw several surprises as the Benetton-BMWs of Teo Fabi and Gerhard Berger filled the front row, Fabi just under 0.2 seconds ahead, while Riccardo Patrese took fourth in his Brabham despite a crash, just behind Keke Rosberg's McLaren. The four Drivers' Championship challengers occupied fifth to eighth in the order of Alain Prost's McLaren, the two Williams of Nigel Mansell and Nelson Piquet, and Ayrton Senna's Lotus. Completing the top ten were Michele Alboreto's Ferrari and Derek Warwick in the second Brabham.

Pat Symonds would later claim that following Benetton's front-row lockout, the head of BMW Motorsport, Paul Rosche, demanded to inspect the engine control unit chips installed in the team's engines to see if they had been tampered with in breach of contract (as Benetton were using customer engines as opposed to the works engines used by Brabham), but the team were able to provide him with unaltered chips rather than the modified ones they had been using.

Qualifying classification

Race

Race report
Warwick was a non-starter in bizarre circumstances. After the Englishman's car was repaired following a gearbox failure in the morning warm-up, the two Brabhams went to the grid, Patrese in the spare car following his qualifying crash. Then, as Patrese took his place on the grid, his own gearbox broke. As the Italian driver was six places ahead of Warwick, the decision was made on the grid to hand him Warwick's car for the rest of the race. Warwick later admitted that team owner Bernie Ecclestone had to physically drag him from the car as he refused to hand it over.

When the race got underway, local driver Berger took the lead from Fabi, while Rosberg and Patrese made slow starts and were overtaken by Prost, Mansell and Piquet. Patrese retired after two laps with an engine failure, while the same fate befell Senna after 13 laps. On lap 17, Fabi overtook Berger at the Bosch-Kurve, only for his own engine to fail seconds later. Mansell moved into second place when Prost made a pit stop for tyres, then the lead shortly afterwards when Berger pitted with a battery problem. Prost took the lead when Mansell made his own pit stop, before both Williams retired within three laps of each other, Piquet with an overheating engine and Mansell with a broken driveshaft. This left Prost around half a minute clear of team-mate Rosberg, with Alboreto up to third. Five laps from the end, Rosberg suffered an electrical failure, leaving Prost to win by a full lap from Alboreto with a further lap back to the second Ferrari of Stefan Johansson in third; the top six was completed by the two Haas Lolas of Alan Jones and Patrick Tambay and the Arrows of Christian Danner. Berger, having lost four laps as a result of his battery problem, made a charge to finish close behind Danner, setting the fastest lap of the race in the process.

With the win, Prost moved from fourth to second in the Drivers' Championship and cut Mansell's lead to two points, 55 to 53, with Senna on 48 and Piquet on 47.

Race classification

Championship standings after the race

Drivers' Championship standings

Constructors' Championship standings

References

Austrian Grand Prix
Grand Prix
Austrian Grand Prix